National Highway 146 (NH 146) is a National Highway in India. This highway is in the state of Madhya Pradesh, running from Bhopal to Sagar. Before renumbering of national highways, NH-146 was numbered as old national highways 86.

Route 

NH146 connects Bhopal, Raisen, Sanchi, Vidisha, Rahatgarh and terminates at Sagar in the state of Madhya Pradesh.

Junctions  

  Terminal near Bhopal
  Terminal near Sagar

See also 
 List of National Highways in India
 List of National Highways in India by state

References

National highways in India
National Highways in Madhya Pradesh